Suddenly may refer to:

Film and television 
 Suddenly (1954 film), an American film noir directed by Lewis Allen
 Suddenly (1996 film), an American television film directed by Robert Allan Ackerman
 Suddenly (2002 film) (Tan de repente), an Argentine-Dutch film directed by Diego Lerman
 Suddenly (2006 film), a Swedish film directed by Johan Brisinger
 "Suddenly" (Grey's Anatomy), a television episode

Music

Albums 
 Suddenly (Arrogance album), or the title song, 1980
 Suddenly (Billy Ocean album), or the title song (see below), 1984
 Suddenly (Caribou album), 2020
 Suddenly (J-Walk album), or the title song, 2002
 Suddenly (Marcus Miller album), or the title song, 1983 
 Suddenly (The Sports album), or the title song, 1980
 Suddenly (EP), by Allstar Weekend, 2010

Songs 
 "Suddenly" (Angry Anderson song), 1987
 "Suddenly" (Arash song), 2008
 "Suddenly" (Ashley Tisdale song), 2008
 "Suddenly" (Billy Ocean song), 1985
 "Suddenly" (BT song), 2010
 "Suddenly" (LeAnn Rimes song), 2003
 "Suddenly" (Les Misérables), from the 2012 film
 "Suddenly" (Olivia Newton-John and Cliff Richard song), 1980
 "Suddenly" (Sean Maguire song), 1995
 "Suddenly" (Soraya song) ("De Repente"), 1996
 "Suddenly" (Toni Braxton song), 2006
 "Suddenly", by Black Rebel Motorcycle Club from Take Them On, On Your Own
 "Suddenly", by Creed from Full Circle
 "Suddenly", by Ryan Ferguson from Three, Four
 "Suddenly", by Solveig from the Help! I'm a Fish film soundtrack
 "Suddenly", by tobyMac from Portable Sounds